Poplar Ridge may refer to the following places:

 Poplar Ridge, New York, a hamlet in Cayuga County, New York, United States
 Poplar Ridge, Ohio, an unincorporated community
 Poplar Ridge, Alabama, a former community in Alabama
 Poplar Ridge, Alberta, a hamlet in Alberta, Canada